John Jeremiah Jacob (December 9, 1829November 24, 1893) was a Democratic politician from Green Spring (Hampshire County), West Virginia. Jacob served two terms as the fourth governor of the U.S. state of West Virginia. John Jeremiah Jacob was also elected to the West Virginia House of Delegates from Hampshire County in 1868 and from Ohio County in 1893.

Background 
John Jeremiah Jacob was born in Green Spring, Virginia on the Potomac River, north of Romney. Jacob's Hampshire County roots made him the first of West Virginia's governors to be born within the present-day borders of the state. Jacob attended the Romney Academy in Romney and Dickinson College in Carlisle, Pennsylvania. Jacob practiced law and taught school in Hampshire County before accepting a teaching position at the University of Missouri in 1853. In 1858, he married Jane Baird.  Jacob worked as an attorney in Missouri during the American Civil War and returned to Romney after the war in 1865 to establish a law practice. In 1868, John Jeremiah Jacob was elected to the West Virginia House of Delegates.

Governor (1871–1877)
Jacob was elected governor in 1870 to a two-year term making him the first of six consecutive Democratic governors. Jacob supported the elimination of all remaining legislation that discriminated against former Confederates. Jacob also presided over the establishment of new facilities to care for the mentally handicapped and the creation of statewide schools, known as normal schools, to train teachers. Most of these schools still exist as part of the state college system.

John Jeremiah Jacob's most important contribution as governor was the rewriting of West Virginia's state constitution. Moderates and former Confederate supporters themselves believed the original 1863 constitution was too biased in favor of pro-Union supporters. A new constitutional convention, controlled by Democrats, met in Charleston in 1872. The new constitution restricted the power of the legislature and expanded the governor's term in office from two to four years, prohibiting consecutive terms.

In 1872 Jacob was denied renomination by the Democratic Party, which was controlled by Camden. Jacob ran on the ad hoc "People's Independent" ticket with Republican support. He was re-elected by 2400 votes for a four-year term. Camden's men controlled the legislature, and passed "ripper" laws that stripped Jacob of his appointment powers.

In 1875, the state government moved from Charleston and returned the capitol to Wheeling in Ohio County.

After Jacob left the governor's office, he served once again in the West Virginia House of Delegates from Ohio County in 1879 and as its circuit judge from 1881 to 1888. Jacob continued to practice law in Wheeling until his death in 1893.

See also

 List of governors of West Virginia

References

Further reading
 Richard E. Fast. The history and government of West Virginia (1901)  pp 169–81  online edition

External links

Biography of Governor John J. Jacob
Inaugural Address of Governor John J. Jacob – March 4, 1871

1829 births
1893 deaths
Burials at Indian Mound Cemetery
Dickinson College alumni
Educators from West Virginia
Governors of West Virginia
Members of the West Virginia House of Delegates
Missouri lawyers
People from Hampshire County, West Virginia
Politicians from Wheeling, West Virginia
University of Missouri faculty
West Virginia Democrats
West Virginia lawyers
West Virginia circuit court judges
Democratic Party governors of West Virginia
Independent state governors of the United States
Republican Party governors of West Virginia
West Virginia Independents
Lawyers from Wheeling, West Virginia
19th-century American politicians
19th-century American lawyers
19th-century American judges